Claude Kogan (1919–1959) was a pioneering French mountaineer who, after climbing a number of peaks in South America, turned to the Himalayas. After notable feats such as the first ascent of Nun (7,135 m (23,409 ft)), she died in October 1959 while leading a women-only expedition to climb Cho Oyu.

Biography
Kogan was born in Paris in 1919. Born to a poor mother, she quit school at 15 and got a job as a seamstress. Her first climbing experience was in the Ardennes of Belgium. She moved to Nice during the German occupation of France where she had a business designing women's swimwear, with Christian Dior as one of her clients. There she met and married mountaineer George Kogan, who was the first to introduce her to climbing. Following the war, the couple became members of the Groupe de Haute Montagne and climbed Chamonix, Dauphiné, the north face of the Dru, and the south ridge of the Aiguille Noire de Peuterey. In the early 1950s she and her husband climbed in South America and claimed the first ascent of Alpamayo, and also reached the summit of Kitarahu (both with Nicole Leiniger). Her husband died in 1951, but Kogan returned to South America in 1952 and climbed Salcantay with the expedition led by Bernard Pierre. In 1953, she climbed Nun in India in a Pierre-led expedition, summitting with Pierre Vittoz after the other climbers had been caught by avalanches; in the American press, the newspapers reported on here as a "Paris dress designer" who realized the "dream of every mountaineer".

Cho Oyu expedition and death

The expedition to Cho Oyu in 1959 was noteworthy not just because it consisted of female climbers but also because it was international: besides the French Kogan it included the British Dorothea Gravina and the Belgian Claudine van der Straten-Ponthoz. In 1954, Kogan, with Raymond Lambert, had been forced to turn back 500 meters from the summit, and she was eager to prove herself.

Kogan and van der Straten-Ponthoz and two Sherpa porters perished in an avalanche. Dorothea Gravina then took charge of the expedition.

Ascents and attempts
Aiguille du Dru, north face, 1946
Alpamayo, claimed first ascent, 1951
Kitarahu, second ascent, 1951
Salcantay, first ascent, 1952
Nun, first ascent, 1953
Yangra in Ganesh Himal, first ascent, 1955

See also
List of deaths on eight-thousanders

References

1919 births
1959 deaths
French mountain climbers
Female climbers
French female mountain climbers
20th-century French women